Kremasta (Greek: Κρεμαστά) may refer to:

Kremasta (lake), an artificial lake in Aetolia-Acarnania and Evrytania, Greece
Kremasta Sykias, a village in the community of Alevrada, Aetolia-Acarnania, Greece
Kremasta, Drama, a village in Drama regional unit, Greece